van der Ploeg is a Dutch surname meaning "from the plow". It can be a metonymic occupational surname, originally referring to a farmer or a bookbinder (a book binding cutter is known as a (snij)ploeg). Alternatively, it may be a toponymic surname, e.g. referring to a house with the sign of a plow.  Notable people with the surname include:

Johannes P. M. van der Ploeg (1909–2004), Dutch linguist and Old Testament scholar
José van der Ploeg (born 1958), Spanish sailor
Neil Van der Ploeg (born 1987), Australian cyclist
Paul van der Ploeg (born 1989), Australian mountain biker
Rick van der Ploeg (born 1956), Dutch economist

See also
Evert Ploeg (born 1963), Australian portrait painter
De Ploeg, an artist collective from the city of Groningen

References

Dutch-language surnames
Occupational surnames

fr:Van der Ploeg